Anand Bakshi (21 July 1930 – 30 March 2002) was an Indian poet and lyricist. He was nominated for the Filmfare award for Best lyricist a total of 40 times, resulting in 4 wins.

Early life 
Anand Bakshi (Bakshi Anand Prakash Vaid) was born in Rawalpindi in the Punjab Province of British India (now in Punjab, Pakistan), on 21 July 1930 into a Mohyal Brahmin family of the Vaid clan. The family arrived in Delhi, via a Dakota aircraft after the Partition of India and then migrated to Pune, then Meerut and settled again finally in Delhi.

Bakshi was fond of writing poetry since his youth, but he did this mostly as a private hobby. In a 1983 interview with Doordarshan, Bakshi recounted that after his initial studies, he joined the Indian Navy, where due to a paucity of time, he could only write occasionally. He continued to write poetry whenever time permitted, and used his songs and lyrics in local programmes related to his troop. He worked in the Navy for many years and simultaneously tried to market his songs in the Mumbai film world.

Career 
Anand Bakshi came to Hindi films to make a name for himself in writing and singing, but ended up becoming more successful in writing lyrics. He got his break writing songs in a Brij Mohan film titled Bhalaa Aadmi (1958), acted by Bhagwan Dada. He wrote four songs in this film. His first song in this film was "Dharti Ke Laal Na Kar Itna Malaal" which was recorded on 9 November 1956. (In his own voice on All India Radio interview)

After writing for a few movies from 1956 onwards, he first found success in 1962 with Mehendi Lagi Mere Haath, which was produced by (LimeLight), Music Kalyanji & Anandji, Music Pub-HMV/Saregama. Bakshi later made another mark for himself writing a quawwali for the 1962 film Kala Samundar, the song was "Meri Tasveer Lekar Kya Karoge Tum" composed by N. Datta.  He got his real big breakthroughs in 1965 with Himalay Ki God Mein, and a huge breakthrough again in 1965 with the super-hit film Jab Jab Phool Khile, starring Shashi Kapoor and both composed by Kalyanji–Anandji; and yet again in 1967 with the super-hit movie Milan (starring Sunil Dutt). These six hit films within a decade of his entry into films cemented his status as a lyrics writer of immense calibre.

Bakshi was preferred lyricist by Rajesh Khanna for films with Rajesh Khanna in lead.
He went on to work as a lyricist of over 4000 songs and 638 films in his career.(See Filmography below for films reference, names of the films and their year of censorship.)

He got his first break as singer in a film directed by Mohan Kumar – Mom Ki Gudiya (1972). The first song he sang was a duet – "Baaghon mein bahaar aayi hothon pe pukaar aayi", along with Lata Mangeshkar, with music composed by Laxmikant–Pyarelal. He also sang the solo "Main dhoondh raha tha sapnon mein" from the same film.

He also sang songs in four other films: Sholay (1975), where he sang the qawwali "Chand Sa Koi Chehera" along with Kishore Kumar, Manna Dey and Bhupinder, (the song was released on vinyl, but not in the feature film); Maha Chor (1976); Charas (1976) Song : Aaja Teri Yaad Aayi; and Balika Badhu (1976).

Anand Bakshi was widely associated with music composers such as Laxmikant–Pyarelal, R D Burman, Kalyanji Anandji, SD Burman, Anu Malik, Rajesh Roshan and Anand–Milind, and his songs have been sung by all the top singers as well as other singers such as Shamshad Begum, Ila Arun, Khursheed Bawra, Amirbai Karnataki, Sudha Malhotra and more. He is known to have worked with more than one generation of music composers.

He wrote the first recorded songs of many first time male and female leads who went on to become stars, and also of singers such as Shailendra Singh, Kumar Sanu, Kavita Krishnamurthy etc., and he established himself as a versatile lyricist with the song "Dum Maro Dum" in the movie Hare Rama Hare Krishna (1972).

After this, he wrote memorable lyrics in many movies including Bobby, Amar Prem (1971), Aradhana (1969), Jeene Ki Raah, Mera Gaon Mera Desh, Aaye Din Bahar Ke, Aya Sawan Jhoom Ke, Seeta Aur Geeta, Sholay (1975), Dharam Veer, Nagina, Lamhe,  Hum (1991), Mohra (1994), Dilwale Dulhania Le Jayenge (1995), Pardes (1997), Heer Raanjha, Dushman (1998), Taal (1998), Mohabbatein (2000), Gadar: Ek Prem Katha (2001), and Yaadein (2001).

Personal life
Bakshi was married to Kamla Mohan Bakshi. The couple had two daughters, Suman Datt and Kavita Bali and two sons Rajesh Bakshi and Rakesh Bakshi.

 Death 
Late in his life, he suffered from heart and lung disease as a consequence of lifelong smoking.  In March 2002, he caught a bacterial infection at Nanavati hospital during a minor heart surgery.  He finally died of multiple organ failure on 30 March 2002, 8:45 PM at Mumbai's Nanavati Hospital, at the age of 71. The last released movie with lyrics by Anand Bakshi (after his death) was Mehbooba, Mujhse Dosti Karoge!''.

Filmography

References

External links 
 

1930 births
2002 deaths
Punjabi people
Indian Hindus
Punjabi Hindus
Punjabi Brahmins
Indian lyricists
Indian male poets
Filmfare Awards winners
People from Rawalpindi
Indian Army personnel
20th-century Indian poets
Poets from Maharashtra
Indian male songwriters
20th-century Indian male writers
20th-century male musicians